Coös County (with two syllables), frequently spelled Coos County, is a county in the U.S. state of New Hampshire. As of the 2020 census, the population was 31,268, making it the least-populated county in the state. The county seat is Lancaster.

The two-syllable pronunciation is sometimes indicated with a diaeresis, notably in the Lancaster-based weekly newspaper The Coös County Democrat and on some county-owned vehicles. The county government uses both spellings interchangeably.

Coös County is part of the Berlin, NH–VT Micropolitan Statistical Area. It is the only New Hampshire county on the Canada–United States border, south of the province of Quebec, and thus is home to New Hampshire's only international port of entry, the Pittsburg–Chartierville Border Crossing. The only city in Coös County is Berlin, with the rest of the communities being towns, or unincorporated townships, gores and grants.

Coös County includes the northernmost part of the state. Major industries include forestry and tourism, with the once-dominant paper-making industry in sharp decline. The county straddles two of the state's tourism regions. The southernmost portion of the county is part of the White Mountains Region and is home to Mount Washington. The remainder of the county is known as the Great North Woods Region, or known locally as the North Country.

Toponymy
The name Coös derives from the Algonquian word meaning "small pines".

History
Coös County was separated from the northern part of Grafton County, New Hampshire, and organized at Berlin December 24, 1803, although the county seat was later moved to Lancaster, with an additional shire town at Colebrook.

During the American Revolutionary War two units of troops of the Continental Army — Bedel's Regiment and Whitcomb's Rangers — were raised from the settlers of Coös. From the Treaty of Paris of 1783 until 1835, the boundaries in the northern tip of the county (and New Hampshire itself) were disputed with Lower Canada (which was soon to become part of the Province of Canada), and for some years residents of the area formed the independent Republic of Indian Stream.

In the 1810 census, there were 3,991 residents, and by 1870 there were nearly 15,000, at which point the entire county was valued at just under , with farm productivity per acre comparing favorably with that of contemporary Illinois. Other early industries included forestry and manufacturing, using 4,450 water horsepower in 1870.

Geography
It is the largest county in New Hampshire by area, and borders both Vermont and Maine, as well as Canada.

Mt. Washington's peak is the highest in the Northeast. The  Cohos Trail runs the length of the county.

The principal state highways in Coös County are New Hampshire Route 16, which runs mostly parallel to the Maine state line and through the city of Berlin, and New Hampshire Route 26, which traverses the Great North Woods from Vermont Route 102 southeast to Maine Route 26 towards Portland. The two major US Highways are US Route 2, which roughly bisects the county from Lancaster to the Oxford County line, and US Route 3, which runs from Carroll in the south to the Pittsburg–Chartierville Border Crossing, where it continues as Quebec Route 257.

Coös County is the least populated of all New Hampshire counties, and the only one with significant amounts of unincorporated land; over half of the municipal-like entities are unincorporated townships, gores, or grants, a rarity in New Hampshire, where nearly all of the land is incorporated as towns or cities. The population of these unincorporated territories is minuscule; collectively they account for less than 1% of the population of the county, with only three (Wentworth Location, Millsfield, and Dixville) reporting populations in the double digits for recent censuses. Approximately 1/3 of the population lives in Berlin, the only city, most populous municipality, and economic hub. Lancaster serves as the county seat.

Mountains
 White Mountains (in the White Mountain National Forest)
 Presidential Range

Adjacent counties
 Oxford County, Maine (east)
 Carroll County (southeast)
 Grafton County (southwest)
 Essex County, Vermont (west)
 Coaticook Regional County Municipality, Quebec, Canada (north)
 Le Haut-Saint-François Regional County Municipality, Quebec, Canada (north)
 Le Granit Regional County Municipality, Quebec, Canada (north)

National protected areas
 Umbagog National Wildlife Refuge (part)
 Silvio O. Conte National Fish and Wildlife Refuge (part)
 White Mountain National Forest (part)

Demographics

2000 census
As of the census of 2000, there were 33,111 people, 13,961 households, and 9,158 families residing in the county.  The population density was 18 people per square mile (7/km2).  There were 19,623 housing units at an average density of 11 per square mile (4/km2).  The racial makeup of the county was 98.05% White, 0.12% Black or African American, 0.28% Native American, 0.37% Asian, 0.02% Pacific Islander, 0.16% from other races, and 1.00% from two or more races.  0.61% of the population were Hispanic or Latino of any race. 23.5% were of French, 19.8% French Canadian, 14.2% English, 10.2% Irish and 10.0% American ancestry. 16.17% of the population speak French at home. 

There were 13,961 households, out of which 28.10% had children under the age of 18 living with them, 52.30% were married couples living together, 8.80% had a female householder with no husband present, and 34.40% were non-families. 28.80% of all households were made up of individuals, and 14.10% had someone living alone who was 65 years of age or older.  The average household size was 2.33 and the average family size was 2.82.

In the county, the population was spread out, with 22.80% under the age of 18, 6.30% from 18 to 24, 26.70% from 25 to 44, 25.70% from 45 to 64, and 18.50% who were 65 years of age or older.  The median age was 42 years. For every 100 females there were 95.60 males.  For every 100 females age 18 and over, there were 92.60 males.

The median income for a household in the county was $33,593, and the median income for a family was $40,654. Males had a median income of $32,152 versus $21,088 for females. The per capita income for the county was $17,218.  About 6.80% of families and 10.00% of the population were below the poverty line, including 10.70% of those under age 18 and 12.50% of those age 65 or over.

2010 census
As of the 2010 United States Census, there were 33,055 people, 14,171 households, and 8,879 families residing in the county. The racial makeup of the county was 96.9% white, 0.5% Asian, 0.4% American Indian, 0.4% black or African American, 0.3% from other races, and 1.4% from two or more races. Those of Hispanic or Latino origin made up 1.2% of the population.

Of the 14,171 households, 25.3% had children under the age of 18 living with them, 48.5% were married couples living together, 9.2% had a female householder with no husband present, 37.3% were non-families, and 30.3% of all households were made up of individuals. The average household size was 2.23 and the average family size was 2.72. The median age was 46.4 years.

18.9% of the population were under the age of 18, 6.7% were from age 18 to 24, 22.1% were from 25 to 44, 32.9% were from 45 to 64, and 19.4% were age 65 or older. The median age was 46.4 years. For every 100 females there were 103.4 males, and for every 100 females age 18 and older, there were 101.8 males.

During the period 2011–2015, the largest self-reported ancestry groups in the county were 39.3% French or French Canadian, 16.9% Irish, 14.2% English, 7.2% "American", 5.5% Italian, 4.9% German, and 3.6% Scottish.

During 2011–2015, the estimated median annual income for a household in the county was $42,312, and the median income for a family was $55,385. Male full-time workers had a median income of $41,934 versus $34,859 for females. The per capita income for the county was $24,546. About 9.9% of families and 14.1% of the population were below the poverty line, including 21.7% of those under age 18 and 8.2% of those age 65 or over.

Politics and government
Coös County has supported the winner of the presidential election in all but three elections since 1892. The exceptions were 1968, 2004, and 2020, when it supported Hubert Humphrey, John Kerry, and Donald Trump, respectively.

County Commission
The executive power of Coös County's government is held by three county commissioners, each representing one of the three commissioner districts within the county.

In addition to the County Commission, there are five directly elected officials: they include County Attorney, Register of Deeds, County Sheriff, Register of Probate, and County Treasurer.

New Hampshire General Court
Coös County sends members to the New Hampshire House of Representatives for seven districts (districts are numbered within each county), and are represented by nine representatives (the New Hampshire House of Representatives has both single-member and multiple-member districts).  

After the 2022 elections, the party distribution of representatives was as follows.

Media

Radio

 WMOU - 1230 AM, Berlin - Nostalgia
 WOTX - 93.7 FM, Groveton - Classic rock - "The Outlaw"
 WHOM - 94.9 FM, Mount Washington - Soft Adult Contemporary - "America's Superstation" (serves Portland, Maine; broadcasts from Mount Washington)
 W238BP - 95.3 FM, Berlin - Hot Adult Contemporary - "Magic 104" - Rebroadcast of WVMJ, North Conway
 W251BD - 98.1 FM, Berlin - Hot Adult Contemporary - "Magic 104" - Rebroadcast of WVMJ, North Conway
 WYKC - 99.1 FM, Jefferson - Contemporary Christian - "K-LOVE"
 WXXS - 102.3 FM, Lancaster -Top 40- "Kiss 102.3"
 WPKQ - 103.7 FM,  North Conway  -  (broadcasts from Mount Washington)
 WEVC - 107.1 FM, Gorham - New Hampshire Public Radio
(Compiled from Radiostationworld.com)

Some stations from nearby Sherbrooke can also be received in Coös County, the strongest being CITE-FM-1 102.7 FM. For details of stations, see Template:Sherbrooke Radio.

Television

 W34DQ-D - Pittsburg - Channel 34, rebroadcast of New Hampshire Public Television (NHPTV)
 W27BL - Berlin - Channel 27, rebroadcast of WMUR-TV (ABC)

Coös County is part of the Portland-Auburn DMA. Cable companies carry local market stations WPFO (Fox), WMTW (ABC), WGME (CBS), and WCSH (NBC), plus NHPTV, WMUR and select stations from the Burlington / Plattsburgh market. Sherbrooke stations CKSH-DT (Ici Radio-Canada Télé) and CHLT-DT (TVA), as well as Montreal station CBMT-DT (CBC) are also available, though reception and/or cable carriage may vary by location.

Newspapers
 The Colebrook Chronicle - Weekly published Fridays from Colebrook, circulation 6,000. Also produces weekly Video New of the Week embedded at website
 The Coös County Democrat - Weekly published Wednesdays from Lancaster
 The News and Sentinel - Weekly in Colebrook
 The Berlin Daily Sun
 The Berlin Reporter - Weekly published Wednesdays from Berlin
 Great Northwoods Journal - Weekly from Lancaster, publication ceased January 2013
 The North Woods Weekly - Weekly from Lancaster, published by The News and Sentinel

Communities

City
 Berlin

Towns

 Carroll
 Clarksville
 Colebrook
 Columbia
 Dalton
 Dummer
 Errol
 Gorham
 Jefferson
 Lancaster (county seat)
 Milan
 Northumberland
 Pittsburg
 Randolph
 Shelburne
 Stark
 Stewartstown
 Stratford
 Whitefield

Townships
Numbers in parentheses indicate each township's population per the 2020 census.

 Atkinson and Gilmanton Academy Grant (0)
 Bean's Grant (0)
 Bean's Purchase (0)
 Cambridge (16)
 Chandler's Purchase (0)
 Crawford's Purchase (0)
 Cutt's Grant (0)
 Dix's Grant (0)
 Dixville (4)
 Erving's Location (0)
 Green's Grant (0)
 Hadley's Purchase (0)
 Kilkenny (0)
 Low and Burbank's Grant (0)
 Martin's Location (2)
 Millsfield (25)
 Odell (1)
 Pinkham's Grant (0)
 Sargent's Purchase (0)
 Second College Grant (1)
 Success (4)
 Thompson and Meserve's Purchase (1)
 Wentworth Location (28)

Census-designated places
 Colebrook
 Gorham
 Groveton
 Lancaster
 West Stewartstown
 Whitefield

Villages

 Beatties
 Bretton Woods
 Cascade
 Dixville Notch
 North Stratford
 Paris
 Tinkerville
 Twin Mountain

In popular culture
Robert Frost, who once lived in Franconia in neighboring Grafton County, wrote the poem "The Witch of Coös".

Coös County is the setting for the John Irving novel Last Night in Twisted River, Twisted River being a logging settlement in the county.

See also

 National Register of Historic Places listings in Coös County, New Hampshire

References

External links

 
 University of New Hampshire Cooperative Extension: Coös County office 
 National Register of Historic Places listing for Coos County

 
Berlin, New Hampshire micropolitan area
1803 establishments in New Hampshire
Populated places established in 1803
New Hampshire placenames of Native American origin